Bug Juice: My Adventures at Camp is an American docuseries that premiered on Disney Channel on July 16, 2018. It is a revival of the original Bug Juice program that aired on Disney Channel from February 28, 1998 to October 15, 2001.

Production 
On August 4, 2017, Disney Channel announced that production was underway for a relaunch of Bug Juice, a docuseries that aired from February 28, 1998 to October 15, 2001. Production took place at Camp Waziyatah in Waterford, Maine, the location of the first season of the original program, with an expected premiere in early 2018. On April 19, 2018, it was announced that the relaunched program would be titled Bug Juice: My Adventures at Camp, and would premiere in summer 2018. The program premiered on July 16, 2018. Douglas Ross, Alex Baskin, Tina Gazzero Clapp, and Toni Gallagher serve as executive producers. The program is produced by Evolution Media. The first season consists of 16 episodes. On July 12, 2018, Disney Channel released the theme song for the program on YouTube.

Episodes

Ratings 
 
}}

References

External links 
 

2010s American children's television series
2018 American television series debuts
2018 American television series endings
Disney Channel original programming
English-language television shows
Television series about summer camps
Summer camps in the United States
Television series by Disney
Television series reboots
Television shows filmed in Maine